Saint Theodore of Sykeon (Greek: Θεόδωρος ό Συκεώτης) was a revered Byzantine ascetic, who lived between the first half of the 6th century and the thirteenth year of the Emperor Heraclius' rule (i. e. 623) in the early 7th century (or on April 22, 613). His hagiography, written after 641, is a key primary source for the reign of Emperor Heraclius (r. 610–641). His feast day is April 22.

Life

Early life
Theodore was born in Sykeon, a village in Galatia. The public highway of the imperial post ran through this village, and on the road stood an inn kept by a very beautiful girl, Mary, her mother, Elpidia, and a sister Despoinia. And these women lived in the inn and followed the profession of courtesans. Theodore was the son of Mary and Cosmas, who had become popular in the Hippodrome in the corps of those who performed acrobatic feats on camels and was appointed to carry out the Emperor's orders.

When he was about twelve years old an epidemic of bubonic plague fell upon the village and it attacked him along with others so that he came near to dying. They took him to the shrine of St. John the Baptist near the village and laid him at the entrance to the sanctuary; he recovered and returned home.

He used to frequent a shrine dedicated to the martyr St. George, located up the rocky hill which lay near the village. At the age of fourteen, he went there to live. Even at such a young age, Theodore was granted the gift of healing.

Theodore then withdrew into complete solitude, to a cave not far from the oratory of St George. He persuaded a deacon to bring him bread and water, and he told no one else where he had hidden himself.

Bishop
For two years St Theodore lived in this seclusion until news of the youth’s exploits reached the local bishop Theodosius, who ordained him to the diaconate, and later to the holy priesthood, although the saint was only seventeen years old at the time.

He was chosen Bishop of Anastasioupolis.

During the reign of Emperor Maurice (r. 582–602), he foretold the emperor's death and "great tribulations, terrible scourges [that] threaten the world." He was soon proven correct with the outbreak of the 26-year-long Persian war sparked by the death of Maurice. He was a close friend of the family of Emperor Phocas. Despite that, he spoke of 
Furthermore, he would only pray for Phocas if the latter stopped massacring people. Still, after the successful rebellion of Emperor Heraclius, he intervened to save the life of Domentziolus, the nephew of Phocas. In return, St. Theodore of Sykeon was asked to "pray for [Heraclius] and his reign."

St. Theodore of Sykeon had good relations with Patriarch Sergius of Constantinople. Still, historian Walter Kaegi says that Heraclius "may always have felt some reserve in his relations with" St. Theodore. During Lent 613, Heraclius asked for St. Theodore's blessing in fighting the Persians. St. Theodore blessed him and invited him to dinner, but Heraclius refused because of time concerns. However, the saint claimed that not accepting his gifts was a "sign of our defeat". Indeed, Heraclius lost the Battle of Antioch.

He died on April 22, 613.

Veneration
His remains were quickly brought to Constantinople to protect them from the Persian war and to add divine protection to the city. An elaborate ceremony of the reception of the remains associated St. Theodore with Heraclius's regime.

Citations

References

External links 

 English Translation of Theodore of Sykeon, abbreviated, on the Internet Medieval Sourcebook
 Three Byzantine Saints Google Book Snippet View

6th-century births
613 deaths
6th-century Byzantine bishops
7th-century Byzantine bishops
7th-century Christian saints